Roe was launched in France in 1787, almost certainly under another name. She first appeared in Lloyd's Register (LR) with Carlisle, master, John Shaw, owner, and trade Liverpool–Africa.

Captain Ledwick (or Ludwick) Carlisle acquired a letter of marque on 24 April 1797. He sailed from Liverpool on 11 May 1797, bound to West Africa to acquire slaves. Roe stopped in Barbados and then arrived at Demerara on 1 March 1798 and there landed 394 slaves. She had left Liverpool with 30 crew members and she suffered two crew deaths on the voyage.

Capture: Lloyd's List (LL) reported on 3 August 1798 that Roe, Carlisle, master, from Demerara to Liverpool, had been captured and taken into Guadeloupe.

In 1801 John Shaw would own a second slave ship named Roe that would make four slave trading voyages.

Citations

1787 ships
Ships built in France
Age of Sail merchant ships of England
Liverpool slave ships
Captured ships